Gunther Castle is a  summit located in the Grand Canyon, in Coconino County of northern Arizona, US. It is situated three miles northwest of Chuar Butte, between Kwagunt Valley to the north, and Chuar Valley to the south.

Gunther Castle is named for Gunther, the historical king of Burgundy in Germanic mythology. This feature's name was officially adopted in 1906 by the U.S. Board on Geographic Names.

The top dome of Gunther Castle is composed of lower strata of the Pennsylvanian-Permian Supai Group. This overlays the conspicuous cliff-forming layer of Mississippian Redwall Limestone, which in turn overlays shale of the Cambrian Tonto Group. According to the Köppen climate classification system, Gunther Castle is located in a Cold semi-arid climate zone. Precipitation runoff from Gunther Castle drains east to the nearby Colorado River via Chuar and Kwagunt Creeks.

The first ascent of Gunther Castle was made by Alan Doty, Doc Ellis, Donald Davis, and Harvey Butchart in June 1969. However, they were not the first to set foot on the summit, as they concluded that surveyors had previously arrived by helicopter, having found a surveyor's marker made of wood and a large coil of unused wire.

See also
 Geology of the Grand Canyon area

References

Gallery

External links 

 Weather forecast: National Weather Service
 First ascent summit photo by Harvey Butchart

Grand Canyon
Landforms of Coconino County, Arizona
Mountains of Arizona
Mountains of Coconino County, Arizona
Colorado Plateau
Grand Canyon National Park
North American 2000 m summits